A statue of Abraham Lincoln by Vinnie Ream is installed in the United States Capitol's rotunda, in Washington, D.C.

See also
 List of sculptures of presidents of the United States
 List of statues of Abraham Lincoln

References

Monuments and memorials in Washington, D.C.
Sculptures of men in Washington, D.C.
Statues of Abraham Lincoln
United States Capitol statues
Sculptures by Vinnie Ream